Sergey Vladimirovich Kotenko  (born 2 December 1956 in Alma-Ata, Kazakh SSR) is a Kazakhstani former water polo player who competed in the 1976 Summer Olympics, in the 1980 Summer Olympics, and in the 1988 Summer Olympics.

See also
 Soviet Union men's Olympic water polo team records and statistics
 List of Olympic champions in men's water polo
 List of Olympic medalists in water polo (men)
 List of world champions in men's water polo
 List of World Aquatics Championships medalists in water polo

References

External links
 

1956 births
Living people
Kazakhstani male water polo players
Olympic water polo players of the Soviet Union
Water polo players at the 1976 Summer Olympics
Water polo players at the 1980 Summer Olympics
Water polo players at the 1988 Summer Olympics
Olympic gold medalists for the Soviet Union
Olympic bronze medalists for the Soviet Union
Olympic medalists in water polo
Sportspeople from Almaty
Soviet male water polo players
Medalists at the 1988 Summer Olympics
Medalists at the 1980 Summer Olympics